Harrowsmith Country Life was a magazine that explored and showcased country living. Originally called Harrowsmith, the magazine was heralded as a back-to-the-land and environmental issues platform. In 1976, founder James M. Lawrence cut and pasted the first issues together on a kitchen table in the tiny village of Camden East (pop. 256) in Ontario, Canada. Within two years, the magazine had over 100,000 subscribers and eventually became Canada's 8th largest magazine. Camden House Publishing Inc. was created in 1977 as the parent company for the Harrowsmith and Equinox magazines and later for many books.

In 1988, Lawrence sold Harrowsmith to the Canadian media company Telemedia, where it remained until 1996. Telemedia launched an American edition, and the words "Country Life" were tacked onto Harrowsmith's title. The American edition reached a paid circulation of 225,000 but folded as Telemedia began making changes to their publishing business. In 1995, it launched a television show to complement the magazine.

Editor Tom Cruickshank took the helm of Harrowsmith Country Life in 1996, after Telemedia sold Harrowsmith Country Life, and its sister publication Equinox, to Malcolm Publishing, a Montreal, company. Equinox ceased publishing in 2000 and its mailing list was sold to Canadian Geographic. Harrowsmith went on to celebrate 30 years of publishing in 2006.

Harrowsmith TV exists as re-runs and Harrowsmith books can still be found. Some titles, such as the Harrowsmith Cookbook (three volumes) are still available through Amazon and Firefly Books. Telemedia no longer exists and many of its assets were sold to Transcontinental Media in 2000.

In 2009, Harrowsmith Country Life had a circulation of 125,00 and revenues of $3.2 million. In 2010, the Canada Periodical Fund provided a subsidy of $334,231 to the magazine's publisher.

In 2011, Harrowsmith Country Life published a single issue in March, and in August 2011 the magazine announced that it would cease publication just short of its 35th anniversary issue. It failed to notify subscribers that the magazine would suspend publishing and those subscribers who had paid for their magazines in advance did not have their money refunded.

In the fall of 2012, after obtaining the licensing rights to Harrowsmith, Yolanda Thornton, a former employee, revived Harrowsmith magazine starting with its sister publication: Harrowsmith's Truly Canadian Almanac for 2013. Moongate Inc. (Toronto, ON) which is also owned by Yolanda Thornton assumed the publishing for Harrowsmith.

In the spring of 2013, a second issue was added: Harrowsmith's Gardening Digest. In 2015 the addition of two more titles saw the release of four issues that year: Harrowsmith's Gardening Digest, Harrowsmith's My Kind of Town, Harrowsmith's Homes and the annual 2015 Harrowsmith's Almanac. For the 2015 annual fall almanac edition (published September 2014), the title was shortened to Harrowsmith's Almanac.

In 2015 and 2016, Harrowsmith embraced the digital market and reached a wider audience with a new format. Two print issues were published (spring and fall) and two online editions (summer and winter) were included in annual subscriptions. "Country Life" was dropped from the title.

In 2017, Harrowsmith redesigned their website to create a virtual community beyond the magazine's pages. They released their first full-size magazine Winter edition in response to reader demand.

References

External links
Ryerson Review of Journalism article "The Laird of Harrowsmith"
Harrowsmith Magazine website
Harrowsmith Country Life website as cached on the Internet Archive

Lifestyle magazines published in Canada
Magazines established in 1976
Magazines published in Ontario
Simple living